Esmee Vermeulen (born 21 April 1996) is a Dutch swimmer.

Vermeulen made her international senior debut at the 2011 European Short Course Swimming Championships in Szczecin, Poland. At the 2014 short-course world championships in Doha, she won three gold medals for swimming in the heats of all three freestyle relays. Together with her teammates Ranomi Kromowidjojo, Maud van der Meer, and Inge Dekker, she broke the world record in the heats of the 4×50 m freestyle relay.

Vermeulen qualified for the 2016 Summer Olympics in Rio de Janeiro in the 4 × 200 meter freestyle relay, where the team finished 14th in the heats.

References

1996 births
Living people
Dutch female long-distance swimmers
Dutch female freestyle swimmers
World record setters in swimming
Olympic swimmers of the Netherlands
Swimmers at the 2016 Summer Olympics
European Aquatics Championships medalists in swimming
World Aquatics Championships medalists in swimming
Medalists at the FINA World Swimming Championships (25 m)
Sportspeople from Zaanstad
21st-century Dutch women